John Gordon Burness (October 2, 1906 – June 20, 1989) was a soccer wing forward who earned a cap with both the Canadian and U.S. national teams.  He began his career in Scotland before moving to Canada and then the United States, where he spent six seasons in the American Soccer League.

Club career
Born in Montrose, Burness began playing with local junior side Brechin Victoria, then Forfar Athletic in the Scottish Football League in summer 1923. At the end of the same year, he transferred to Brechin City. He then left Scotland for Canada where he played for Toronto Scottish.

In 1925, he signed with the Brooklyn Wanderers of the American Soccer League.  After two seasons, he transferred to the Boston Wonder Workers, winning the 1927–28 league title with them.

Burness began the 1929–30 season with Boston, but moved to the New Bedford Whalers after only four games.  He played ten with the Whalers, then transferred to the Pawtucket Rangers for one game in the 1929–30 season.  He then played nineteen games of the 1930 fall season in Pawtucket, before transferring to the Fall River Marksmen for the final six league games.  The Marksmen merged with the New York Soccer Club in 1931 to form the New York Yankees.  Burness remained with the renamed team for the 1931 spring season.  However, the team had already begun games in the National Challenge Cup under the name Marksmen, so Burness and his teammates won the National Cup as the Fall River Marksmen.  That cup went to three games and Burness scored one of the two Fall River goals in the 2–0 final game victory.  He then finished his professional career with the Boston Bears in the 1931 fall season.

National team
Burness earned his first cap, with Canada, in a 6–1 loss to the United States on November 8, 1925.  He scored the lone Canadian goal in the loss.  A year later, he became one of a handful of players to earn a cap with two countries when he played for the U.S. in a 6–2 win over Canada on November 6, 1926.

Post soccer career
Burness later worked as a traffic controller of ocean shipping for Exxon Oil Company.

See also
List of association footballers who have been capped for two senior national teams
List of United States men's international soccer players born outside the United States

References

External links
 National Soccer Hall of Fame eligibility bio

1906 births
1989 deaths
American Soccer League (1921–1933) players
American soccer players
Boston Bears players
Boston Soccer Club players
Brechin City F.C. players
Brooklyn Wanderers players
Canadian emigrants to the United States
Canadian National Soccer League players
Canada men's international soccer players
Dual internationalists (football)
Expatriate soccer players in Canada
Expatriate soccer players in the United States
Fall River Marksmen players
Forfar Athletic F.C. players
New Bedford Whalers players
New York Yankees (soccer) players
Pawtucket Rangers players
Scottish emigrants to Canada
Toronto Scottish players
United States men's international soccer players
People from Montrose, Angus
Scottish footballers
Canadian soccer players
Association football wingers
American people of Scottish descent
British emigrants to Canada
Footballers from Angus, Scotland
Brechin Victoria F.C. players